Life Support is a 2007 American drama television film directed by Nelson George and starring Queen Latifah. It is loosely based on the real-life story of Ana Wallace, an HIV-positive woman.

The film premiered January 26, 2007 at the 2007 Sundance Film Festival and premiered on HBO on March 10, 2007.

Plot
Ana Wallace (Queen Latifah) was diagnosed with HIV 11 years ago. She got the virus from shooting cocaine with her boyfriend, Slick (Wendell Pierce). Slick had the virus first but did not tell Ana he had it. Ana is devoted to her work at Life Support, an AIDS outreach group, but she struggles to repair her relationship with her teenage daughter, whom she lost custody of 11 years ago due to her drug addiction.

Cast
 Queen Latifah as Ana Wallace
 Anna Deavere Smith as Lucille
 Wendell Pierce as Slick
 Rachel Nicks as Kelly Wallace
 Evan Ross as Amare
 Gloria Reuben as Sandra
 Tony Rock as Ness
 Darrin Dewitt Henson as MJ2
 Tracee Ellis Ross as Tanya
 Limary L. Agosto as Woman #1
 Carlos Alban as Andre
 Brandon Scott as Markus
 Sidné Anderson as Sister Bernice
 Dorothea Golden as Peer Counselor #1
 Chyna Layne as Deyah
 Angel Magee as Peer Counselor #2
 Andrea Williams as Andrea Williams

Critical reception
Critics gave the film favorable reviews. On the review aggregator Metacritic, the film had an average score of 77 out of 100, based on 9 reviews.

Awards and nominations

References

External links
 
 
 
 Life Support at sundance.org

2007 television films
2007 films
2007 drama films
HIV/AIDS in American films
HIV/AIDS in television
American drama television films
2000s English-language films
2000s American films